Sándor Nagy (2 November 1946 – 24 August 2015) was a Hungarian trade unionist and politician, Member of Parliament between 1980–1985 (representing Kaposvár), 1988–1990 (MSZMP) and 1994–2006 (MSZP). He was leader of the Socialists' parliamentary group between 1 January 2001 and 14 May 2002. He served as Political State Secretary of the Prime Minister's Office from 2002 to 2006.

In 1980, he was delegated to the Presidential Council of the Hungarian People's Republic. In May 1988, he was elected member to the Central Committee of the ruling communist Socialist Workers' Party. Following the end of communism, he was President of the National Confederation of Hungarian Trade Unions (MSzOSz) between 1990 and 1995.

Before the 2002 parliamentary election, Nagy was one of the four Socialist candidates for the position of Prime Minister of Hungary. Later Nagy, alongside Miklós Németh withdrew from nomination and the MSZP's congress elected Péter Medgyessy as candidate, who finally won the election and became Prime Minister.

Personal life
He was married and had two sons, Sándor and Zoltán.

Death
Nagy died on 24 August 2015 at the age of 68, following a short illness.

References

1946 births
2015 deaths
Hungarian trade unionists
Members of the Hungarian Socialist Workers' Party
Hungarian Socialist Party politicians
Members of the National Assembly of Hungary (1980–1985)
Members of the National Assembly of Hungary (1985–1990)
Members of the National Assembly of Hungary (1994–1998)
Members of the National Assembly of Hungary (1998–2002)
Members of the National Assembly of Hungary (2002–2006)
People from Hajdú-Bihar County